Michael or Mike Bradley may refer to:

Politicians 
Michael Bradley (politician) (died 1923), Irish politician
Michael J. Bradley (politician) (1897–1979), U.S. politician
Michael J. Bradley (colonial administrator) (1933–2010), Governor of the Turks and Caicos, 1987–1993
Mike Bradley (politician) (born 1955), Canadian politician

Sports 
Michael Bradley (rugby union, born 1897) (1897–1951), Irish and British Lions rugby union player
Michael Bradley (cricketer) (born 1934), English cricketer
Mike Bradley (athlete) (born 1961), American former sprinter
Michael Bradley (rugby union, born 1962), Irish former rugby union player and coach of Edinburgh Rugby
Michael Bradley (golfer) (born 1966), American professional golfer
Mike Bradley (Canadian football) (born 1978), Canadian Football League player
Michael Bradley (basketball) (born 1979), American basketball player
Michael Bradley (soccer) (born 1987), American soccer player
Michael Bradley (hurler), Irish hurler

Other people 
Michael Bradley (businessman), British businessman, chief executive of Defence Equipment and Support
Michael Bradley (musician) (born 1959), bassist for The Undertones
Michael Bradley (singer), former lead singer of Paul Revere & the Raiders and composer (Robotech)
Mike Bradley, General Secretary of the General Federation of Trade Unions
Mike Bradley, President and CEO of Teradyne

See also 
Michael Brantley (born 1987), American baseball player